Ruyan may refer to:

 Dragonite International Limited, formerly Ruyan, a pharmaceutical company in Hong Kong

Places
 Ruyan (district), a part of Mazandaran Province, Iran
 Ruyan, Semnan, a village in Semnan Province, Iran
 Ruyan, West Azerbaijan, a village in West Azerbaijan Province, Iran

See also
 Royan